The Toxaway River is a  waterway that flows south from headwaters in Transylvania County, North Carolina, into Lake Toxaway and over Toxaway Falls, after which it crosses into South Carolina and enters Lake Jocassee, the reservoir behind Lake Jocassee Dam.

In Lake Jocassee the Toxaway River is joined by the Whitewater River to form the Keowee River.  The confluence is submerged beneath the waters of Lake Jocassee. Via the Keowee and Seneca rivers, the Toxaway River is part of the Savannah River watershed.

Variant names
According to the Geographic Names Information System, it has also been known historically as:  
Jocassa River
Jocassee River
Keowee River

References

Rivers of North Carolina
Rivers of South Carolina
Rivers of Transylvania County, North Carolina
Rivers of Pickens County, South Carolina
Tributaries of the Savannah River